Zhang Ping (born March 23, 1982) is a Chinese volleyball player who competed in the 2004 Summer Olympics.

In 2004, she was a member of the Chinese team which won the gold medal in the Olympic tournament.

References

External links
 

1982 births
Living people
Chinese women's volleyball players
Olympic volleyball players of China
Volleyball players at the 2004 Summer Olympics
Olympic gold medalists for China
Olympic medalists in volleyball
Volleyball players from Tianjin
Medalists at the 2004 Summer Olympics
Asian Games medalists in volleyball
Volleyball players at the 2006 Asian Games
Asian Games gold medalists for China
Medalists at the 2006 Asian Games
21st-century Chinese women